Guillamon Island is an uninhabited island south of Scalpay, in the council area of Highland, Scotland. It is entirely greenstone. The name origin is obscure. Guillemon was recorded as being part of the Trap Islands. It was bought for £11,000.

References

External links 
 

Uninhabited islands of Highland (council area)